Tony Schwartz may refer to:

Tony Schwartz (sound archivist) (1923–2008), American sound designer, media theorist and advertising creator
Tony Schwartz (author) (born 1952), American writer, speaker, and businessman
Anthony Schwartz (born 2000), American sprinter and American football player